"Rock and Roll Ain't Noise Pollution" is a song by the rock band AC/DC. It is the tenth and final track of their album released in 1980, Back in Black. It is the fourth and final single released from the album. The song reached number 15 on the UK singles charts, the highest placing of any song on the album.

Background
Initially only nine tracks were written for Back in Black but Atlantic Records, as well as the band's management recommended that they should write one more song. Angus and Malcolm wrote the song in about 15 minutes. Lead singer Brian Johnson recalled "I'll never forget the start of it. I went into the recording booth, the intro starts and I hear: 'Brian, it's Mutt. Could you say something over that?" He starts to repeat the lyrics loudly, head tilted slightly back: "All you middle men throw away your fancy clothes. For some reason middle men were in the news at the time, the top guys weren't getting the blame and the workforce weren't getting it either, it was the middle men who were this grey area. I must have picked up on it and it just went from there." 

Malcolm explained the origin of the song:

Release 
The song also appears in videos like No Bull (1996), Family Jewels (2005) and Plug Me In (2007), also appears on the boxset Bonfire (1997).

The song appears on the 2003 tribute album by various artists to the band, Back in Baroque: The String Tribute to AC / DC, it was also covered in 2004 by death metal band Six Feet Under in the album Graveyard Classics 2. Alex Gibson also covered the song in 2008 from the album Rockabye Baby!: Lullaby Renditions of AC/DC. The song was featured in a commercial for Nike in 2006, as well as one for Applebee's in 2016.

Track listing
"Rock and Roll Ain't Noise Pollution" – 4:12
"Hells Bells" – 5:10

Chart positions

Weekly Charts

Year-end charts

Personnel
Brian Johnson – lead vocals
Angus Young – lead guitar
Malcolm Young – rhythm guitar, background vocals
Cliff Williams – bass guitar, background vocals
Phil Rudd – drums

Notes

External links
 Back in Black review
 Rock N' Roll Ain't Noise Pollution in Songfacts
 [ Rock N' Roll Ain't Noise Pollution in Allmusic]

AC/DC songs
1980 songs
1980 singles
Song recordings produced by Robert John "Mutt" Lange
Songs about rock music
Songs written by Brian Johnson
Songs written by Angus Young
Songs written by Malcolm Young
Protest songs
Blues rock songs
Atlantic Records singles